The 1999–2000 Washington State Cougars men's basketball team represented Washington State University for the 1999–2000 NCAA Division I men's basketball season. Led by first-year head coach Paul Graham, the Cougars were members of the Pacific-10 Conference and played their home games on campus at Beasley Coliseum in Pullman, Washington.

Graham was hired in March 1999; he was previously an assistant at Oklahoma State under

References

External links
Sports Reference – Washington State Cougars: 1999–2000 basketball season

Washington State Cougars men's basketball seasons
Washington State Cougars
Washington State
Washington State